The 1951 Tasmanian Australian National Football League (TANFL) premiership season was an Australian Rules football competition staged in Hobart, Tasmania over fifteen (15) roster rounds and four (4) finals series matches between 14 April and 6 October 1951.

Participating Clubs
Clarence District Football Club
New Town District Football Club
Hobart Football Club
New Norfolk District Football Club
North Hobart Football Club
Sandy Bay Football Club

1951 TANFL Club Coaches
Les McClements (Clarence)
Roy Cazaly (New Town)
Bill Tonks (Hobart)
Arthur Olliver (New Norfolk)
Len McCankie (North Hobart)
Bert Lucas (Sandy Bay)

TANFL Reserves Grand Final
New Town 11.18 (84) v Nth Hobart 10.7 (67) – North Hobart Oval

TANFL Under-19's Grand Final
State Schools Old Boys Football Association (SSOBFA) 
 Buckingham 17.7 (109) v North West 7.10 (52) – North Hobart Oval
Note: Buckingham affiliated to New Town, North West affiliated to North Hobart.

Intrastate Matches
Jubilee Shield (Saturday, 5 May 1951) 
TANFL 15.23 (113) v NTFA 13.14 (92) – Att: 8,886 at North Hobart Oval

Jubilee Shield (Saturday, 16 June 1951) 
TANFL 19.18 (132) v NWFU 13.16 (94) – Att: 4,056 at TCA Ground

Jubilee Shield (Saturday, 21 July 1951) 
TANFL 14.10 (94) v NTFA 10.19 (79) – Att: 11,300 at York Park

Jubilee Shield (Saturday, 18 August 1951) 
TANFL 23.12 (150) v NWFU 17.13 (115) – Att: 4,530 at West Park Oval

Inter-Association Match (Saturday, 21 July 1951) 
Huon FA 11.14 (80) v TANFL II 9.9 (63) – Att: 1,000 at Geeveston Oval

Inter-Association Match (Saturday, 18 August 1951) 
Huon FA 12.22 (94) v TANFL II 12.15 (87) – Att: 1,326 at TCA Ground

Inter-Association Match (Sunday, 19 August 1951) 
TANFL III 15.12 (102) v Queenstown FA 14.13 (97) – Att: N/A at Queenstown Oval

Interstate Matches
Exhibition Match (Saturday, 26 May 1951) 
Essendon 20.18 (138) v TANFL 13.4 (82) – Att: 7,973 at North Hobart Oval

Interstate Match (Saturday, 30 June 1951) 
Victorian FA 26.15 (171) v Tasmania 12.11 (83) – Att: 6,949 at North Hobart Oval

Leading Goalkickers: TANFL
 J.Cooper (Clarence) – 42
 Les McClements (Clarence) – 41
 W.Pepper (Hobart) – 36
 Rex Garwood (New Town) – 35
 R.Grattidge (Clarence) – 31

Medal Winners
Rex Garwood (New Town) – William Leitch Medal
R.Toulmin (Sandy Bay) – George Watt Medal (Reserves)
Brian Cartwright (South East) – V.A Geard Medal (Under-19's)
Max Griffiths (New Town) – Weller Arnold Medal (Best TANFL player in Intrastate match)

1951 TANFL Ladder

Round 1
(Saturday, 14 April 1951) 
Clarence 12.16 (88) v New Town 12.13 (85) – Att: 3,312 at North Hobart Oval
Hobart 16.15 (111) v Sandy Bay 12.10 (82) – Att: 1,997 at TCA Ground
Nth Hobart 12.8 (80) v New Norfolk 6.11 (47) – Att: 1,430 at Boyer Oval

Round 2
(Saturday, 21 April 1951) 
Nth Hobart 8.10 (58) v Sandy Bay 7.12 (54) – Att: 2,847 at North Hobart Oval
Hobart 13.9 (87) v New Town 10.15 (75) – Att: 1,811 at New Town Oval
Clarence 11.11 (77) v New Norfolk 9.15 (69) – Att: 1,226 at Bellerive Oval

Round 3
(Saturday, 28 April 1951) 
Clarence 12.11 (83) v Sandy Bay 12.9 (81) – Att: 3,674 at North Hobart Oval
Nth Hobart 12.14 (86) v Hobart 10.13 (73) – Att: 2,659 at TCA Ground
New Norfolk 14.13 (97) v New Town 11.12 (78) – Att: 1,983 at Boyer Oval

Round 4
(Saturday, 12 May 1951) 
Hobart 17.15 (117) v New Norfolk 14.11 (95) – Att: 2,395 at North Hobart Oval
Clarence 10.11 (71) v Nth Hobart 8.15 (63) – Att: 3,719 at TCA Ground
New Town 16.14 (110) v Sandy Bay 9.8 (62) – Att: 2,028 at Queenborough Oval

Round 5
(Saturday, 19 May 1951) 
Nth Hobart 10.12 (72) v New Town 9.10 (64) – Att: 3,873 at North Hobart Oval
Clarence 17.9 (111) v Hobart 11.19 (85) – Att: 3,217 at Bellerive Oval
New Norfolk 14.8 (92) v Sandy Bay 12.11 (83) – Att: 1,837 at Boyer Oval

Round 6
(Saturday, 2 June 1951) 
Nth Hobart 15.17 (107) v New Norfolk 16.9 (105) – Att: 3,396 at North Hobart Oval
Sandy Bay 17.26 (128) v Hobart 10.9 (69) – Att: 1,748 at Queenborough Oval
New Town 16.24 (120) v Clarence 10.10 (70) – Att: 2,068 at Bellerive Oval

Round 7
(Saturday, 9 June & Monday, 11 June 1951) 
Sandy Bay 12.12 (84) v Nth Hobart 7.10 (52) – Att: 4,318 at North Hobart Oval
Clarence 13.9 (87) v New Norfolk 7.10 (52) – Att: 1,724 at Boyer Oval
Hobart 9.15 (69) v New Town 8.10 (58) – Att: 5,040 at North Hobart Oval (Monday)

Round 8
(Saturday, 23 June 1951) 
Nth Hobart 15.13 (103) v Hobart 11.15 (81) – Att: 2,518 at North Hobart Oval
Sandy Bay 15.15 (105) v Clarence 16.9 (105) – Att: 2,388 at Queenborough Oval
New Town 18.15 (123) v New Norfolk 12.12 (84) – Att: 1,455 at New Town Oval

Round 9
(Saturday, 7 July 1951) 
New Town 10.14 (74) v Sandy Bay 10.8 (68) – Att: 3,732 at North Hobart Oval
Nth Hobart 21.7 (133) v Clarence 10.7 (67) – Att: 1,774 at Bellerive Oval
New Norfolk 7.8 (50) v Hobart 5.16 (46) – Att: 964 at Boyer Oval

Round 10
(Saturday, 14 July 1951) 
New Norfolk 12.8 (80) v Sandy Bay 10.11 (71) – Att: 2,045 at North Hobart Oval
Hobart 13.21 (99) v Clarence 11.11 (77) – Att: 1,267 at TCA Ground
New Town 11.13 (79) v Nth Hobart 10.17 (77) – Att: 2,817 at New Town Oval

Round 11
(Saturday, 28 July 1951) 
Hobart 12.16 (88) v Sandy Bay 5.12 (42) – Att: 2,145 at North Hobart Oval
New Town 10.17 (77) v Clarence 4.10 (34) – Att: 1,759 at New Town Oval
Nth Hobart 4.11 (35) v New Norfolk 3.12 (30) – Att: 1,245 at Boyer Oval

Round 12
(Saturday, 4 August 1951) 
New Norfolk 14.9 (93) v Clarence 7.11 (53) – Att: 1,899 at North Hobart Oval
Hobart 12.10 (82) v New Town 10.13 (73) – Att: 2,317 at TCA Ground
Sandy Bay 16.10 (106) v Nth Hobart 10.16 (76) – Att: 1,608 at Queenborough Oval

Round 13
(Saturday, 25 August 1951) 
New Town 17.13 (115) v New Norfolk 13.8 (86) – Att: 2,283 at North Hobart Oval
Hobart 16.16 (112) v Nth Hobart 11.11 (77) – Att: 2,080 at TCA Ground
Clarence 9.16 (70) v Sandy Bay 10.10 (70) – Att: 1,675 at Bellerive Oval
Note: Round postponed on 11 August due to inclement weather and poor ground conditions.

Round 14
(Saturday, 1 September 1951) 
Nth Hobart 10.20 (80) v Clarence 10.16 (76) – Att: 2,777 at North Hobart Oval
New Norfolk 13.24 (102) v Hobart 14.15 (99) – Att: 1,439 at TCA Ground
New Town 21.27 (153) v Sandy Bay 13.8 (86) – Att: 1,531 at New Town Oval

Round 15
(Saturday, 8 September 1951) 
New Town 19.11 (125) v Nth Hobart 16.7 (103) – Att: 4,849 at North Hobart Oval
New Norfolk 21.17 (143) v Sandy Bay 11.9 (75) – Att: 934 at Queenborough Oval
Hobart 12.21 (93) v Clarence 10.12 (72) – Att: 1,929 at Bellerive Oval

First Semi Final
(Saturday, 15 September 1951) 
Nth Hobart: 5.2 (32) | 7.10 (52) | 11.14 (80) | 14.20 (104)
New Norfolk: 3.1 (19) | 7.1 (43) | 11.2 (68) | 14.4 (88)
Attendance: 7,179 at North Hobart Oval

Second Semi Final
(Saturday, 22 September 1951) 
New Town: 5.4 (34) | 10.7 (67) | 11.15 (81) | 17.22 (124)
Hobart: 2.1 (13) | 6.8 (44) | 9.8 (62) | 11.8 (74)
Attendance: 7,979 at North Hobart Oval

Preliminary Final
(Saturday, 29 September 1951) 
Nth Hobart: 6.2 (38) | 7.6 (48) | 11.10 (76) | 12.14 (86)
Hobart: 2.2 (14) | 7.4 (46) | 9.8 (62) | 10.13 (73)
Attendance: 7,070 at North Hobart Oval

Grand Final
(Saturday, 6 October 1951) 
New Town: 7.2 (44) | 10.5 (65) | 15.12 (102) | 20.14 (134)
Nth Hobart: 2.0 (12) | 5.5 (35) | 6.6 (42) | 9.9 (63)
Attendance: 13,079 at North Hobart Oval

Source: All scores and statistics courtesy of the Hobart Mercury publication.

Tasmanian Football League seasons